Superstars and Cannonballs is a DVD/VHS released in 2001 after the Superstars & Cannonballs tour in Brisbane by Savage Garden. It predominantly consisted of tour footage, however also contained a short documentary, "Parallel Lives".
The DVD is approximately 110 minutes in duration and, as well as the tour and short documentary, includes 3 bonus music videos ("I Knew I Loved You", "Crash and Burn" and "Affirmation"). The footage of 11 cameras, eventually lent clips to the music video of the single "Affirmation". The name Superstars and Cannonballs is taken from a part of "The Animal Song" lyrics.

Tagline
The Complete Concert. The Unedited Documentary. The World Premiere of the "Music Video" Event of the Year.

Listing
 "The Best Thing"
 "Break Me Shake Me"
 "To the Moon and Back"
 "The Lover After Me"
 "I Don't Know You Anymore"
 "Santa Monica"
 "Two Beds and a Coffee Machine"
 "You Can Still Be Free"
 "The Animal Song"
 "Hold Me"
 "Gunning Down Romance"
 "Crash and Burn"
 "Truly Madly Deeply"
 "Chained to You"
 "I Want You"
 "I Knew I Loved You"
 "Affirmation"

Credits
 Executive producer: David Wilson (on behalf of Worldstar)
 Director: Mark Adamson
 Producer: Cathie Scott
 Production manager: Sarah Harold
 Audio director: John Simpson
 Director's assistant: Lynda Threlfall
 Documentary produced by: Ephiphany Productions
 Producer/Director: Pip Mattiske
 Production manager: Claire Davidson
 Savage Garden recorded for: JWM Productions (John Woodruff Management)

Savage Garden video albums
2001 video albums